Mohan Chopra (10 September 1921 – 11 December 1969) was a Hindi intellectual and author.

Life
Mohan Chopra was born at Gurdaspur, Punjab, India. He received his education at Dalhousie, Gurdaspur, and Lahore. He earned an M.A. in English and taught in colleges at Lahore, Ludhiana, Ferozepur, and Hissar.

Works

Short stories
Chopra's first short story was published in 1953 in a Calcuttan magazine called Ranee. He wrote about a hundred short stories in his life. Most of them were published in a magazine from Allahabad called Kahani. These stories are included in several collections of short stories titled Aadha Kata Hua Surya, Peele Patte, Sham Aur Akela Aadmi, Band Darwaza, Intezaar Aur Terah Anya Kahaniyan and Mohan Chopra ki Shresth Kahaniyan. A  number of these short stories have been translated in other Indian languages.

Novels
Mohan Chopra's novel, Bahein, was published in 1956. Thereafter, five other novels were published: Needh Se Aage, Ek Chhaya Aur Main, Subah Se Pahle, Ye Naye Log, and Tuta Hua Aadmi. Ek Chhaya Aur Main was translated into the Kannada language and  published under the name Bhranti Samar.

Drama
In the field of drama, three of Mohan Chopra's works were published: Samay Ke Swar, a collection of one-act plays; Chattan Ka Phool, a collection of radio plays; and Aandhi Aur Ghar, a full-length play. Aandhi Aur Ghar was written along the lines of a Greek drama, keeping in view the unity of time, place, and action.

Travelogue
Vaadiyon Ke Raaste, a travelogue, was published in 1968.

Poetry
Chopra published two books of poetry: Nai Subah Ke Charan in 1968 and Coffee House Mein Mynah in 2000.

Subject of Ph.D research
His works were the subject of extensive research by Kurukshetra University. In 2000, a Ph.D degree was awarded to Promila Anand for research work entitled Mohan Chopra Ka Vyaktitava Aur Krititava. In 2009, another Ph.D degree was awarded to Seema Devi for her research work entitled Mohan Chopra Ke Sahitya Mein Vyakt Jeewan Darshan. His works were also the subject of many M. Phil degrees awarded by Kurukshetra and Guru Nanak Dev Universities.

Awards
His novels Tuta Hua Aadmi and Ye Naye Log, the full-length play Aandhi Aur Ghar, and collection of short stories Aadha Kata Hua Surya were declared the best works of the year for 1971, 1972, and 1973 respectively by the Haryana Government. His novel Ye Naye Log was declared the best work for the year 1972 by the Punjab Government.

Mohan Chopra's works in chronological order
Samay Ke Swar, a collection of one-act plays, 1955
Baahein, a novel, 1956
Needh Se Aage, a novel, 1961
Chattan Ka Phool, a collection of radio plays, 1963
Ek Chhaya Aur Main, a novel, 1965
Nai Subah Ke Charan, a collection of poems, 1967
Vaadiyon Ke Raaste, a travelogue, 1968
Subah Se Pahle, a novel, 1969
Ye Naye Log, a novel, 1970
Tuta Hua Aadmi, a novel, 1971
Aandhi Aur Ghar, a full-length play, 1972
Aadha Kata Hua Surya, a collection of short stories, 1973
Peele Patte, Sham Aur Akela Aadmi, a collection of short stories,1987
Band Darwaja, a collection of short stories, 1990
Coffee House Main Mynah, a collection of poems, 2000
Intezaar Aur Terah Anya Kahaaniyan, a collection of short stories, 2002

References

External links
 Books by Mohan Chopra

Hindi-language writers
1921 births
1969 deaths
Indian writers